Tingena epimylia is a species of moth in the family Oecophoridae. It is endemic to New Zealand and is found in both the North and the South Islands. This species is similar in appearance to Tingena contextella as it too has a mottled appearance, but T. epimylia can be distinguished as it is smaller in size, slightly narrower wings, and has a more grey appearance and a grey head. This species inhabits native beech forests at altitudes between 1500 and 2000 ft and in particular has an affinity for Nothofagus solandri.

Taxonomy 

This species was first described by Edward Meyrick in 1883 using specimens collect at Castle Hill. He originally named the species Oecophora epimylia. Meyrick went on to give a fuller description of the species in 1884. In 1915 Meyrick placed this species within the Borkhausenia genus. In 1926 Alfred Philpott studied the genitalia of the male of this species however his illustrations are considerably different from the gnathos and valva structure of the lectotype and paralectotype. George Hudson discussed this species under the name B. epimylia in his 1928 publication The butterflies and moths of New Zealand. In 1988 J. S. Dugdale placed this species in the genus Tingena. The male lectotype is held at the Natural History Museum, London.

Description 

Meyrick described this species as follows:

His more detailed description is as follows:

This species is similar in appearance to Tingena contextella as it too has a mottled appearance, but T. epimylia can be distinguished as it is smaller in size, slightly narrower wings, and has a more grey appearance and a grey head.

Distribution
This species is endemic to New Zealand and has been observed at its type locality of Castle Hill, as well as in the Tararua Ranges, in Nelson, Bealey River, and Lake Wakatipu.

Habitat
This species inhabits native beech forests at altitudes between 1500 and 2000 ft and in particular has an affinity for Nothofagus solandri.

References

Oecophoridae
Moths of New Zealand
Moths described in 1883
Endemic fauna of New Zealand
Taxa named by Edward Meyrick
Endemic moths of New Zealand